Hwang Sun-ai (Hangul: 황선애, Hanja: 黄善愛) (born 1962 in Daejeon) is a retired female badminton player from South Korea.

Career
Hwang started playing table tennis for a while at a young age until her table tennis team from her school was dissolved and replaced by a badminton team when she was in her last year of elementary school. She switched over and became a badminton player. She continued to play in middle school, in the Daejeon area. There was a women's team at the national tobacco company headquarters, in her neighborhood, and the military team, where some of Korea's eventual top coaches played as young men, also trained in the same location. So she as well as other young players learned a lot from the older badminton specialists training in the same place at that time. When she graduated to high school she left to Masan over 200 km away from home, in South Gyeongsang Province, to play for the Sungji Girls’ High School badminton team there, which was already very famous for its badminton program. From there she was selected by the Korea Badminton Association for the Asian Games in 1978. In January 1981 she won two events, the Chinese Taipei Open in Taiwan and the Japan Open, therefore receiving an invitation for the All England Open that year.

Hwang gained international attention in 1981 when she swept four championships including the All England Open. In the final of the women's singles at the 1981 All England Open Badminton Championships, she defeated two-time All England defending champion Lene Køppen of Denmark, allowing only three points. In June 1981, Hwang was ranked number 1 in the world by the International Badminton Federation. After her All England victory, also a first for South Korea, she was asked to visit the Blue House, the Korean president's residence and was even voted "Athlete of the Year" in Korea.

Hwang began the 1981–1982 season in a slump due to a ankle injury that she suffered at the end of the previous season, and in singles won only a bronze medal at the Japan Open. However, she won her first international doubles gold medal at the 1982 Asian Games, with partner Kang Haeng-suk.

In 1983 Hwang continued to struggle with injury which seriously hampered the pace of her training. She was left off the South Korean national team and only played in South Korea's collegiate competitions.

In March 1985 Hwang was called up to the national team again but mainly as a doubles player. In June 1985 she won a bronze medal at the World Championships in women's doubles with Kang Haeng-suk.

Hwang injured herself at the Scandinavian Open in March 1986 and damaged her ankle and waist again at the Uber Cup in Jakarta, Indonesia in April 1986. No longer selected for the national squad, she retired from badminton in 1987.

Titles

Singles

Doubles

Personal life
Hwang Sun-ai has been working as a teacher in her hometown of Daejeon for more than twenty years.

References

Pat Davis: The Encyclopaedia of Badminton. Robert Hale, London, 1987,

External links
 
European results
All England champions 1899–2007

1962 births
Living people
South Korean female badminton players
Asian Games medalists in badminton
Asian Games gold medalists for South Korea
Asian Games bronze medalists for South Korea
Badminton players at the 1982 Asian Games
Medalists at the 1982 Asian Games
World Games medalists in badminton
World Games silver medalists
Competitors at the 1981 World Games
Sportspeople from Daejeon